Joseph Kane was a filmmaker.

Joseph or Joe Kane may also refer to:

Joe Kane, author and journalist
Joe Kane, editor of Phantom of the Movies' Videoscope
Joseph Nathan Kane (1899–2002), American non-fiction writer and journalist
Joseph T. Kane, a perpetrator of the 2010 West Memphis police shootings

See also
Joseph Cain (disambiguation)